Wayne High School is a secondary public school located in Huber Heights, Ohio, north of Dayton, Ohio. With the high school being established in 1956, the school district was formerly known as Wayne Township Local School District. In 1981, the name changed to Huber Heights City School District when the majority of Wayne Township was turned into Huber Heights City. In February 2021, Ohio Treasurer Robert Sprague named the school one of three Ohio Compass Award honorees of the month for its financial education curriculum and partnership with Sinclair Community College with its College Credit Plus program.

Facilities 

The construction of new buildings for five elementary schools, a new junior high, and a new high school was completed in 2012.  Usage of the new high school building began in January 2013. Before then, there was a second junior high school which is now an independent preschool/ central district office.

The five elementary schools and single junior high that feed Wayne High School are as follows:

  Charles Huber Elementary
  Monticello Elementary
  Rushmore Elementary
  Valley Forge Elementary
  Wright Brothers Elementary
  Weisenborn Junior High

The old high school comprised seven separate single-story buildings connected by covered walkways: Filbrun Hall (including the cafeteria, library, music rehearsal hall, and woodworking and metalworking shops), Hawke Hall, Storck Hall, Douglass Hall, Shank Hall, Alumni Hall, and the Gymnasium and Auditorium.

The Gymnasium and Auditorium were retained for continued usage.

The new building covers approximately 292,000 square feet.  The building includes a new and larger gymnasium. It also includes a new and larger cafeteria.

Athletics 
Wayne High School competes interscholastically in boys and girls sports as a member of the Greater Western Ohio Conference (GWOC). The Warriors primary league rival is Centerville High School.

In its 65+ year history, Wayne's varsity football team has won several conference championships and has played in the OHSAA playoff tournament 23 times. In 1999, 2010, 2014, and 2015, the team made it to the Division I state championship game, completing the season as State Runner-Up all four times.

The football and soccer teams play home games at Good Samaritan Athletic Field at Heidkamp Stadium.

Ohio High School Athletic Association State Championships

 Boys track and field – 1995, 2000
 Boys basketball - 2015
 Boys Bowling - 2016

Notable alumni
 Will Allen – former NFL safety for the Pittsburgh Steelers
 Kelley Deal – musician, The Breeders
 Kim Deal – musician, The Breeders
 Dallas Egbert, sixteen-year-old child prodigy whose four-week disappearance in 1979 was incorrectly attributed to steam tunnels and Dungeons & Dragons
 Marcus Freeman, former Ohio State linebacker, former NFL linebacker, current Notre Dame Football head coach
 Victor Heflin – former NFL defensive back, St. Louis Cardinals
 Vince Heflin – former NFL wide receiver, Miami Dolphins and Tampa Bay Buccaneers
 Tyree Kinnel - former University of Michigan safety, former NFL practice squad player
 Trey Landers - professional basketball player, played college basketball for the Dayton Flyers
 Mike Mickens – former NFL cornerback, currently cornerbacks coach for the University of Notre Dame
 Braxton Miller, former Ohio State quarterback
 Greg Orton, former Purdue University wide receiver, former NFL wide receiver, Super Bowl Champion with the New England Patriots.
 Kyle Swords, former professional soccer player
 Teresa Pace, PhD – Institute of Electrical and Electronics Engineers (IEEE) Fellow, past president of IEEE Aerospace and Electronic Systems Society
 D'Mitrik Trice - professional basketball player, played college basketball for the Wisconsin Badgers
 Travis Trice - professional basketball player, played college basketball for the Michigan State Spartans
 Larry Turner - former NFL offensive lineman, played college football for the Eastern Kentucky Colonels
 Xeyrius Williams - professional basketball player, played college basketball for the Dayton Flyers and the Akron Zips
 Jerel Worthy - former NFL defensive tackle, played college football for the Michigan State Spartans

Notes and references

External links
 Wayne High School
 http://www.greatschools.org/ohio/huber-heights/3956-Wayne-High-School/reviews/
 Official Alumni Class web pages (free)

High schools in Montgomery County, Ohio
Public high schools in Ohio